State Route 246 (SR 246) is a  long north-south state highway in Middle Tennessee. It connects the cities of Columbia with Franklin via the community of Burwood. SR 246 serves as an alternate route to U.S. Route 31 (US 31) to the east.

Route description

SR 246 begins as Carters Creek Pike in Maury County at the northern edge of Columbia at an intersection with US 31 (SR 6). It winds its northwest through industrial areas before leaving Columbia and continuing north through farmland. The highway then has a concurrency with SR 247 shortly before crossing into Williamson County. SR 246 turns northeast and passes through the community of Burwood, where it has an interchange with Interstate 840 (I-840; Exit 23), before passing through hilly and rural areas. It then enters Franklin, where it passes through neighborhoods, as Main Street, for several miles before entering downtown and making an abrupt right turn onto 7th Avenue before coming to an end at an intersection with US 31 (SR 6/Columbia Avenue). The entire route of SR 246 is a two-lane highway.

Major intersections

References

246
Transportation in Maury County, Tennessee
Transportation in Williamson County, Tennessee